The 2019 Road to the Kentucky Derby was a series of races through which horses qualified for the 2019 Kentucky Derby, which was held on May 4, 2019. The field for the Derby is limited to 20 horses, with up to four 'also eligibles' in case of a late withdrawal from the field. There are three separate paths for horses to take to qualify for the Derby: the main Road consisting of races in North America (plus one in Dubai), the Japan Road consisting of four races in Japan, and a European Road consisting of seven races in England, Ireland and France.

The main Road to the Kentucky Derby gives points to the top four finishers in specified races. The 2019 season was supposed to remain the same as the 2018 Road to the Kentucky Derby, consisting of 35 races broken down into 19 races for the Kentucky Derby Prep Season and 16 races for the Kentucky Derby Championship Season. Earnings in non-restricted stakes act as a tie breaker. However, the San Felipe Stakes was not run in 2019 due to difficulties with the track surface at Santa Anita Park in the wake of heavy winter rains, while the Rebel Stakes was run in two divisions with the posts adjusted to 37.5-15-7.5-3.75 for each division.

For 2019, some small changes were made from 2018 for the other series:
 Race changes: In the European Road, the Cardinal Stakes replaced the Burradon Stakes. Added a fourth race to the Japan series – the Fukuryu Stakes.
 Points system changes: Fukuryu Stakes in Japan was set at 40-16-8-4 points to the top four placings. The Zen-Nippon Nisai Yushun points were doubled to 20-8-4-2.

Main Road to the Kentucky Derby

Standings

The following table shows the points earned in the eligible races for the main series.  Entries for the 2019 Kentucky Derby were taken on April 30. Omaha Beach was originally entered but was scratched on May 1 due to an entrapped epiglottis. Haikal subsequently scratched as well. As a result, Bodexpress drew into the race.

Country House, who qualified by finishing second in the Risen Star and third in the Arkansas Derby, was declared the winner after Maximum Security was disqualified for interference.

 Winner of Kentucky Derby in bold
 Entrants for Kentucky Derby in blue
 "Also eligible" for Kentucky Derby in green 
 Did not qualify/Not nominated/No longer under Derby consideration/Sidelined in gray-->

Prep season results

Note: 1st=10 points; 2nd=4 points; 3rd=2 points; 4th=1 point (except the Breeders' Cup Juvenile: 1st=20 points; 2nd=8 points; 3rd=4 points; 4th=2 point)

Championship series results

First leg of series
Note: 1st=50 points; 2nd=20 points; 3rd=10 points; 4th=5 points except for the Rebel Stakes
 
Rebel Stakes (both divisions) 1st=37.5 points; 2nd=15 points; 3rd=7.5 points; 4th=3.75 points

Second leg of series
These races are the major preps for the Kentucky Derby, and are thus weighted more heavily.
Note: 1st=100 points; 2nd=40 points; 3rd=20 points; 4th=10 points

"Wild Card" events
Note: 1st=20 points; 2nd=8 points; 3rd=4 points; 4th=2 points

Japan Road to the Kentucky Derby

The Japan Road to the Kentucky Derby is intended to provide a place in the Derby starting gate to the top finisher in the series. If the connections of that horse decline the invitation, their place is offered to the second-place finisher and so on through the top four finishers. If none of the top four accept, this place in the starting gate reverts to the horses on the main road to the Derby.

In 2019, the top three finishers in the Japan Road declined the invitation as they had not been nominated to the Derby. The connections of the fourth-place finisher, Master Fencer, decided to accept the offer, marking the first time that a Japanese-bred horse will enter the Derby.

Qualification table
The top four horses (colored brown within the standings) are eligible to participate in the Kentucky Derby provided the horse is nominated.

Notes: 
 blue highlight – accepted offer to enter the Kentucky Derby
 brown highlight – qualified on points but declined offer
 grey highlight – did not qualify

Events

Notes: 
Cattleya Sho:  1st=10 points; 2nd=4 points; 3rd=2 points; 4th=1 point
Zen-Nippon Nisai Yushun:  1st=20 points; 2nd=8 points; 3rd=4 points; 4th=2 points
Hyacinth: 1st=30 points; 2nd=12 points; 3rd=6 points; 4th=3 points
Fukuryu : 1st=40 points; 2nd=16 points; 3rd=8 points; 4th=4 points

European Road to the Kentucky Derby

The European Road to the Kentucky Derby is designed on a similar basis to the Japan Road and is intended to provide a place in the Derby starting gate to the top finisher in the series. If the connections of that horse decline the invitation, their place is offered to the second-place finisher and so on. If none of the top four accept, this place in the starting gate reverts to the horses on the main road to the Derby.

The series consists of seven races – four run on the turf in late 2018 when the horses are age two, plus three races run on a synthetic surface in early 2018.

Qualification Table
The top four horses (colored brown within the standings) were eligible to participate in the Kentucky Derby provided the horse is nominated. However, none of the connections accepted the invitation, so this position in the starting gate reverted to horses on the main Road.

Events

Note:
 the four races in 2018 for two-year-olds: 1st=10 points; 2nd=4 points; 3rd=2 points; 4th=1 point
 the first two races in 2019: 1st=20 points; 2nd=8 points; 3rd=4 points; 4th=2 points
 The Cardinal Stakes: 1st=30 points; 2nd=12 points; 3rd=6 points; 4th=3 points

See also
2019 Road to the Kentucky Oaks

Notes

References

External links

Road to the Kentucky Derby, 2019
Road to the Kentucky Derby
Road to the Kentucky Derby